Gert Fridolf Fredriksson (21 November 1919 – 5 July 2006) was a Swedish sprint canoeist. Competing in four Summer Olympics, he won eight medals including six golds (1948: K-1 1000 m, K-1 10000 m; 1952: K-1 1000 m, 1956: K-1 1000 m, K-1 10000 m; 1960: K-2 1000 m), one silver (1952: K-1 10000 m), and one bronze (K-1 1000 m). At the 1964 Summer Olympics in Tokyo, Fredriksson was head coach of the Swedish team.

He was the most successful male canoeist ever, having gained medals in a succession of Swedish, Nordic, World and Olympic championships from 1942 to 1960. With six gold medals Fredriksson remains the most successful Swede at the Olympics.

He also won seven gold medals at the World Championships and 71 medals in the Swedish championships.

Fredriksson was awarded the Svenska Dagbladet Gold Medal in 1949. In 1956 he was awarded the Mohammad Taher trophy by the International Olympic Committee as the number one sportsman in the world, the only canoeist to be presented with this trophy.

See also
List of multiple Olympic gold medalists

References

 
 
 
 International Olympic Committee biography
 
 Wallechinsky, David and Jaime Loucky (2008). "Canoeing: Kayak Pairs 1000 Meters". In The Complete Book of the Olympics: 2008 Edition. London: Aurum Press Limited. p. 475.

External links

 
 
 

1919 births
2006 deaths
People from Nyköping Municipality
Canoeists at the 1948 Summer Olympics
Canoeists at the 1952 Summer Olympics
Canoeists at the 1956 Summer Olympics
Canoeists at the 1960 Summer Olympics
Olympic canoeists of Sweden
Olympic gold medalists for Sweden
Olympic silver medalists for Sweden
Olympic bronze medalists for Sweden
Swedish male canoeists
Olympic medalists in canoeing
ICF Canoe Sprint World Championships medalists in kayak
Medalists at the 1960 Summer Olympics
Medalists at the 1956 Summer Olympics
Medalists at the 1952 Summer Olympics
Medalists at the 1948 Summer Olympics
Sportspeople from Södermanland County